Cambiago is a comune (municipality) in the Metropolitan City of Milan in the Italian region Lombardy, located about  northeast of Milan. 
 
Cambiago borders the following municipalities: Basiano, Cavenago di Brianza, Agrate Brianza, Masate, Caponago, Gessate, Pessano con Bornago.

The headquarters of high-end road-racing bicycle manufacturer Colnago is located in Cambiago.

References

External links
[url=http://www.comune.cambiago.mi.it Official website]

Cities and towns in Lombardy